The 1989 Australia rugby union tour was a series of rugby union matches played on tour by the Australia national rugby union team in Canada and France between October and November 1989.

Results 
Scores and results list Australia's points tally first.

References

1989 rugby union tours
1989
1989
1989
1989–90 in French rugby union
1989 in Australian rugby union
1989 in Canadian rugby union